Benzaldehyde (C6H5CHO) is an organic compound consisting of a benzene ring with a formyl substituent. It is the simplest aromatic aldehyde and one of the most industrially useful.

It is a colorless liquid with a characteristic almond-like odor. The primary component of bitter almond oil, benzaldehyde  can be extracted from a number of other natural sources. Synthetic benzaldehyde is the flavoring agent in imitation almond extract, which is used to flavor cakes and other baked goods.

History

Benzaldehyde was first extracted in 1803 by the French pharmacist Martrès. His experiments focused on elucidating the nature of amygdalin, the poisonous material found in bitter almonds, the fruit of Prunus dulcis.  Further work on the oil by Pierre Robiquet and Antoine Boutron Charlard, two French chemists, produced benzaldehyde. In 1832, Friedrich Wöhler and Justus von Liebig first synthesized benzaldehyde.

Production 
As of 1999, 7000 tonnes of synthetic and 100 tonnes of natural benzaldehyde were produced annually. Liquid phase chlorination and oxidation of toluene are the main routes. Numerous other methods have been developed, such as the partial oxidation of benzyl alcohol, alkali hydrolysis of benzal chloride, and the carbonylation of benzene.

A significant quantity of natural benzaldehyde is produced from cinnamaldehyde obtained from cassia oil by the retro-aldol reaction: the cinnamaldehyde is heated in an aqueous/alcoholic solution between 90 °C and 150 °C with a base (most commonly sodium carbonate or bicarbonate) for 5 to 80 hours, followed by distillation of the formed benzaldehyde. This reaction also yields acetaldehyde. The natural status of benzaldehyde obtained in this way is controversial.

"Site-specific nuclear magnetic resonance spectroscopy", which evaluates 1H/2H isotope ratios, has been used to differentiate between naturally occurring and synthetic benzaldehyde.

Occurrence
Benzaldehyde and similar chemicals occur naturally in many foods.  Most of the benzaldehyde that people eat is from natural plant foods, such as almonds.

Almonds, apricots, apples, and cherry kernels contain significant amounts of amygdalin. This glycoside breaks up under enzyme catalysis into benzaldehyde, hydrogen cyanide and two equivalents of glucose.

Benzaldehyde contributes to the scent of oyster mushrooms (Pleurotus ostreatus).

Reactions 
Benzaldehyde can be oxidized to benzoic acid; in fact "[B]enzaldehyde readily undergoes autoxidation to form benzoic acid on exposure to air at room temperature" causing a common impurity in laboratory samples. Since the boiling point of benzoic acid is much higher than that of benzaldehyde, it may be purified by distillation. Benzyl alcohol can be formed from benzaldehyde by means of hydrogenation.  Reaction of benzaldehyde with anhydrous sodium acetate and acetic anhydride yields cinnamic acid, while alcoholic potassium cyanide can be used to catalyze the condensation of benzaldehyde to benzoin. Benzaldehyde undergoes disproportionation upon treatment with concentrated alkali (Cannizzaro reaction): one molecule of the aldehyde is reduced to the benzyl alcohol and another molecule is simultaneously oxidized to benzoic acid.

With diols, including many sugars, benzaldehyde condenses to form benzylidene acetals.

Uses 
Benzaldehyde is commonly employed to confer almond flavor to foods and scented products, including e-cigarette liquids. It is sometimes used in cosmetics products.

In industrial settings, benzaldehyde is used chiefly as a precursor to other organic compounds, ranging from pharmaceuticals to plastic additives. The aniline dye malachite green is prepared from benzaldehyde and dimethylaniline.  Benzaldehyde is also a precursor to certain acridine dyes. Via aldol condensations, benzaldehyde is converted into derivatives of cinnamaldehyde and styrene. The synthesis of mandelic acid starts with the addition of hydrocyanic acid to benzaldehyde:

The resulting cyanohydrin is hydrolysed to mandelic acid. (The scheme above depicts only one of the two formed enantiomers).

Niche uses
Benzaldehyde is used as a bee repellent.  A small amount of benzaldehyde solution is placed on a Fume Board near the honeycombs. The bees then move away from the honey combs to avoid the fumes. The beekeeper can then remove the honey frames from the bee hive with less risk to both bees and beekeeper.

Safety 
As used in food, cosmetics, pharmaceuticals, and soap, benzaldehyde is "generally regarded as safe" (GRAS) by the US FDA and FEMA. This status was reaffirmed after a review in 2005. It is accepted in the European Union as a flavoring agent.  Toxicology studies indicate that it is safe and non-carcinogenic in the concentrations used for foods and cosmetics,  and may even have anti-carcinogenic (anti-cancer) properties.

For a 70 kg human, the lethal dose is estimated at 50 mL.  An acceptable daily intake of 15 mg/day has been identified for benzaldehyde by the United States Environmental Protection Agency. Benzaldehyde does not accumulate in human tissues. It is metabolized and then excreted in urine.

References

External links 

 Archived
 Benzaldehyde description at ChemicalLand21.com
 ChemSub Online: Benzaldéhyde.
 Carcinogenicity Potency Project

Flavors
 
Solvents
Phenyl compounds